Kore may refer to:

Arts and entertainment
Kore (comics), a comic-book series by Josh Blaylock and Tim Seeley
Kore (producer), French-Algerian music producer, also part of duo Kore & Skalp
Kore (sculpture), a type of ancient Greek sculpture depicting a young female

Business
KORE, an AM radio station in Springfield, Oregon, US
KORE Wireless, company, Alpharetta, Georgia, US
Kore Press, publisher, Tucson, Arizona, US
Kore (energy drink)

Places
Kore, Togo
Kore (moon), a natural satellite of Jupiter
Kore (woreda), Ethiopia
Orange Municipal Airport, Massachusetts (ICAO airport code: KORE)

Other uses
Persephone, a goddess in Greek mythology
Kore people, a people on Lamu Island in Kenya
Kore University of Enna, Sicily, Italy
Korean mixed script, by ISO 15924 code
Koda language, of India and Bangladesh
Kore (mythology), child eating demon from Albanian mythology
The Kore Gang, a 2011 platformer video game

People with the given name
Kore Tola (born 1997), Ethiopian middle-distance runner
Kore Yamazaki, Japanese manga artist

People with the surname
Prabhakar Kore (born 1947), Indian politician from  Karnataka
Vinay Kore (born 1971), Indian politician from Maharashtra
Akshayraj Kore (born 1988), Indian chess player
[shivling B.kore] born 1990 indian regional languages publications maharashtra

See also
Core (disambiguation)
Kores (disambiguation)